Heibert is a surname. Notable people with the surname include:

 Al Hiebert (1938–2000), Canadian politician
 Robert Heibert (1886–1933), German World War I flying ace

See also
 Herbert (surname)